Pedro de Agurto, O.S.A. (1544 – October 15, 1608) was the first Bishop of the Roman Catholic Diocese of Cebu (1595–1608).

Biography
Pedro de Agurto was ordained a priest in the Order of Saint Augustine. On August 30, 1595, Pope Clement VIII appointed him Bishop of Cebu. He was consecrated bishop on August 3, 1597, by Diego de Romano y Govea (Vitoria), Bishop of  Tlaxcala.

See also
Catholic Church in the Philippines

References

1544 births
People from Mexico City
Filipino people of Mexican descent
Bishops appointed by Pope Clement VIII
Augustinian bishops
Mexican Servants of God
1608 deaths
Roman Catholic bishops of Cebu